Torbanlea Railway Station is a closed railway station on the North Coast railway line in Queensland, Australia. It served the town of Torbanlea and its coal mine.

History
The station was built in 1883 after coal was discovered at the small town. The station was closed in 1900 along with the mine after an explosion killed 5 people.

References

Disused railway stations in Queensland
North Coast railway line, Queensland
Fraser Coast Region

External links